Jean-Paul Boëtius (born 22 March 1994) is a Dutch professional footballer who plays as a winger for Bundesliga club Hertha BSC and the Netherlands national team.

He made his debut for hometown club Feyenoord in 2012 at the age of 18 and remained at the club for three years before moving to Swiss club FC Basel. At Basel, he failed to establish himself. Following a loan to Belgian side Genk in the second half of the 2016–17 season, he returned to Feyenoord.

Having represented the Netherlands at various youth levels, he made one appearance for the senior team in 2014.

Club career

Feyenoord
Boëtius made his debut for Feyenoord at the age of 18, when then-manager Ronald Koeman named him in the starting line-up in De Klassieker, the main football rivalry in The Netherlands, at home against long-time rivals Ajax on 28 October 2012. Having never made the bench before, Boëtius was a shock addition in the starting line-up and ended up scoring the equaliser in a game that ended in a 2–2 draw to cap off a positive debut performance. He quickly became a starter for the Rotterdam-based club as a left winger. In his first season in the Eredivisie, Boëtius played in 20 league games, scoring 4 goals and delivering 2 assists. Feyenoord finished the 2012–13 season on 3rd position and secured a spot in the Europa League play-off's for the next season. However, Boëtius' season was ended prematurely after suffering a knee injury during a training session in April.

Because of the knee injury, Boëtius missed the beginning of the 2013–14 season. He made his season debut on 15 September 2013 coming off the bench in the 62nd minute against NEC Nijmegen. Just five minutes after entering the pitch Boëtius scored a goal giving his team a 2–1 lead. During the season Boëtius scored 10 goals in 29 appearances. He finished 3rd among the league's assists leaders with a total of 9 assists. Feyenoord ended the season on the second place only behind Ajax, earning a spot in the UEFA Champions League third qualifying round.

Basel
On 2 August 2015, it was announced that Boëtius was signed by Swiss side Basel. On the next day Basel confimed the transfer, stating that Boëtius had signrd a four-year contract with them. Boëtius joined Basel's first team for their 2015–16 season under head coach Urs Fischer. Boëtius made his first team debut for Basel in the 2015–16 UEFA Champions League play-off round on 19 August in the match against Maccabi Tel Aviv which ended in a 2–2 draw. Boëtius played his domestic league debut for his new club in the away game in the  Cornaredo on 22 August as Basel won 3–1 against FC Lugano. He scored his first goal for the team in the Europa League group stage away game on 10 December 2015 and it was the only goal of the match as Basel won 1–0 against Lech Poznań. He scored his first league goal for the club on 20 April 2016 in the home game in the St. Jakob-Park as Basel won 3–0 against FC Lugano. However, during the entire season Boëtius was used mainly as substitute. Under trainer Fischer Boëtius won the Swiss Super League championship at the end of the season. For the club it was the seventh title in a row and their 19th championship title in total.

In the following season Boëtius could not reach the status of becoming a regular player either and so during the winter break the club looked for another solution. On 31 January 2017, FC Basel announced that they loaned Boëtius to KRC Genk until the end of the season and that KRC had the option for a permanent takeover. Genk did not pull the option. However, Boëtius did not return to Basel and he moved on. During his short time with the club, Boëtius played a total of 36 games for Basel scoring a total of 7 goals. 14 of these games were in the Swiss Super League, three in the Swiss Cup, six in the UEFA competitions (Champions League and Europa League) and 13 were friendly games. He scored three goals in the domestic league, three in the Swiss Cup the other were scored in the Europa League.

Feyenoord
On 23 June 2017, Feyenoord announced that Boëtius would return to the club on a three-year contract. On 22 April 2018, he played as Feyenoord won the 2017–18 KNVB Cup final 3–0 against AZ Alkmaar.

At the start of the 2018–19 season, Boëtius received a disciplinary suspension for refusing a training mandatory for players who did not start the match against Fenerbahce. During the first league match of the season, the attacker was sent off after receiving his second yellow card, for a sarcastic applause towards the referee after receiving his first yellow card. After that, Feyenoord manager Giovanni van Bronckhorst told him it was going to be a difficult situation for him, and he was allowed to leave the club.

Mainz 05
In August 2018, Boëtius joined Bundesliga side 1. FSV Mainz 05 on a four-year contract. The transfer fee paid to Feyenoord was reported as €3.5 million.

On 20 June 2020, Boëtius scored Mainz's second goal in a 3–1 victory over Werder Bremen in the penultimate match of the Bundesliga season. The win secured the club's place in the Bundesliga for the following campaign.

Hertha BSC 
On 8 August 2022, Boëtius  joined Bundesliga side Hertha BSC on a free transfer, signing a three-year contract.

International career
On 6 March 2013, Boëtius was called up for the preliminary squad of the Dutch national team for the first time, aged only 18. He made his debut for the Netherlands national team on 5 March 2014 in an exhibition match against France at Stade de France in Saint-Denis. He started the match as a left winger but was substituted in the 72nd minute as the Netherlands were defeated 0–2.

Boëtius was called up to the Dutch preliminary squad for the FIFA World Cup 2014 in Brazil. However, he was omitted in coach Louis van Gaal's final selection.

Personal life
Born in the Netherlands, Boëtius is of Surinamese descent. Boëtius is a cousin of Urby Emanuelson, another professional football player, who currently plays for FC Utrecht.

In September 2022 he was diagnosed with testicular cancer.

Career statistics

Club

International

Honours
Basel
 Swiss Super League: 2015–16

Feyenoord
KNVB Cup: 2017–18
Johan Cruijff Shield: 2017, 2018

Netherlands U17
 UEFA European Under-17 Championship: 2011

References

External links

 Profile at the Hertha BSC website
 
 
 
 Profile season 2015/16 on the Swiss Football League homepage

1994 births
Living people
Footballers from Rotterdam
Dutch sportspeople of Surinamese descent
Association football wingers
Dutch footballers
Feyenoord players
FC Basel players
K.R.C. Genk players
1. FSV Mainz 05 players
 Hertha BSC players
Eredivisie players
Swiss Super League players
Belgian Pro League players
Netherlands youth international footballers
Netherlands under-21 international footballers
Netherlands international footballers
Dutch expatriate footballers
Expatriate footballers in Switzerland
Dutch expatriate sportspeople in Switzerland
Dutch expatriate sportspeople in Belgium
Dutch expatriate sportspeople in Germany
Expatriate footballers in Germany
Expatriate footballers in Belgium
Bundesliga players